This is a list of notable hospitals and medical centers in the Harrisburg, Pennsylvania, United States metropolitan area.

 Carlisle Regional Medical Center Carlisle
 Community General Osteopathic Hospital Harrisburg
 Fredricksen Outpatient Center Mechanicsburg
 Good Samaritan Hospital Lebanon
 UPMC Harrisburg Harrisburg
 Hamilton Health Center Harrisburg, Steelton
 Harrisburg State Hospital Harrisburg
 Penn State Holy Spirit Camp Hill
 Lebanon VA Medical Center Lebanon
 Penn State Milton S. Hershey Medical Center Hershey
 Polyclinic Medical Center Harrisburg
 Seidle Memorial Hospital Mechanicsburg
 UPMC West Shore Mechanicsburg

See also
 List of hospitals in Pennsylvania

Harrisburg
Pennsylvania, Harrisburg